The Soviet Class A First Group (Soviet football championship (Class A First Group)) was the top and for a season second highest division of Soviet football, below the 1970 Soviet Class A Top Group. The league was formed in 1950 in place of the First Group of the Soviet football championship and initially was called as Class A of the Soviet football championship. 

In 1963 the Class A was expanded into two divisions the Class A First Group and the Class A Second Group, latter becoming the second tier. In 1970 the Soviet Class A was expanded even further adding additional tier to the top and downgrading now the Soviet Class A First Group to the second tier. In 1971 it was replaced with the Soviet First League.

Winners

Top tier

Second tier

1
Defunct second level football leagues in Europe
Sports leagues established in 1950
Sports leagues disestablished in 1970
1950 establishments in the Soviet Union
1970 disestablishments in the Soviet Union